5:01 Blues is the forty-sixth studio album by American recording artist Merle Haggard, with backing by The Strangers. It was released in 1989 and was his last studio album on the Epic label. It peaked at number 28 on the Billboard country albums chart. It was co-produced by Mark Yeary, keyboardist of The Strangers.

History
Although Haggard's tenure with Epic had been a success in its first three years, producing twelve top-ten hits (with nine of them going to number one), his relationship with the label deteriorated in the latter part of the 1980s. 5:01 Blues was to be his last studio album with  Epic. The single, "A Better Love Next Time", became Haggard's last top 5 solo single, while two other singles, "If You Want to Be My Woman" and the title track, failed to crack the top 20 on the country charts. A final single, the opener "Broken Friend" did not chart. "Someday We'll Know" was co-written by Haggard and Teresa Lane, who later become Haggard's fifth wife.

Critical reception

Stephen Thomas Erlewine of AllMusic deems the album "an amiable, enjoyable set," but concludes that "it's fairly clear things are beginning to wrap up between the singer and the label... he's on his own, working with Mark Yeary and Ken Suesov, just relaxing through a set of laid-back ballads and blues." Music critic Robert Christgau wrote "A slight improvement over 1988's feckless Out Among the Stars, due mostly to a formulaic title tune Hag didn't write. But if he thinks he isn't getting away with shit, he needs a shrink."

Track listing
"Broken Friend" (Merle Haggard) – 2:41
"Losin' In Las Vegas" (Raymond McDonald) – 3:36
"5:01 Blues" (Michael Garvin, Jeffery M. Tweel) – 3:14
"Someday We'll Know" (Haggard, Theresa Lane) – 3:15
"Wouldn't That Be Something" (Haggard, Freddy Powers) – 3:01
"Sea of Heartbreak" (Hal David, Paul Hampton) – 2:51
"A Better Love Next Time" (Johnny Christopher, Bobby Wood) – 2:42
"If You Want To Be My Woman" (Haggard) – 2:42
"A Thousand Lies Ago" (Haggard) – 3:54
"Somewhere Down The Line" (Haggard, Powers) – 2:36

Personnel
Merle Haggard – lead vocals, electric guitar

The Strangers:
Norm Hamlet – pedal steel guitar
Clint Strong – acoustic guitar, electric guitar
Bobby Wayne – acoustic guitar, electric guitar
Mark Yeary – hammond organ, piano, electric piano
Jimmy Belkin – fiddle, strings
Biff Adam – drums
Don Markham – saxophone, trumpet
Gary Church – cornet, trombone

with:
Eldon Shamblin – electric guitar
Bonnie Owens – background vocals

and:
Billy Shaw – electric guitar
Reggie Young – electric guitar
Steve Gibson – acoustic guitar, electric guitar
Johnny Christopher – acoustic guitar, background vocals
Mike Leech – bass guitar
Jerry Carrigan – drum programming, percussion
Gene Chrisman – drums
Tom Roady – percussion
Wendell Jr. - percussion
Bobby Wood - synthesizer, background vocals
Susan Boyd – background vocals
Joe Chemay – background vocals
Jim Haas – background vocals
Jon Joice – background vocals

References

1989 albums
Merle Haggard albums
Epic Records albums